The discography of MellowHype, an American duo, record producer and member of the Los Angeles, California hip hop collective Odd Future, encompasses 2 studio albums, 3 mixtape, 2 singles, and 6 music videos.

Studio albums

With Odd Future

With Domo Genesis as MellowHigh

Compilations

Mixtapes

Singles

Music videos

See also
Hodgy discography
Left Brain production discography

References 

Hip hop discographies